This is the discography of the voice actress and singer Maaya Sakamoto.

Albums

Studio albums

Mini albums

Compilations

Tribute albums

Singles

Digital singles

DVDs

Other appearances

Soundtracks
Sakamoto has worked, listed in alphabetical order on these soundtracks.
23-ji no Ongaku: NHK Renzoku Drama "Mayonaka wa Betsu no Kao"
Arjuna: Into the Another World 
Arjuna: Onna no Minato
Brain Powerd Original Soundtrack 2 
Cardcaptor Sakura Original Soundtrack 4
Clamp in Wonderland: Precious Songs
DeViceReigN OST
Dream Power: Tsubasanaki Mono-tachi e
El-Hazard: The Alternative World Ongakuhen
Escaflowne Movie Original Soundtrack
Game Vocal Best: Shikura Chiyomaru Gakkyokushū Vol.1
Ghost in the Shell: Stand Alone Complex - Be Human
Kōya no Medarot
Les Misérables 2003 Original Cast CD: "Purple" label recording starring Kiyotaka Imai as Valjean
Linebarrels of Iron Original Soundtrack
Little Lovers Soundtrack
Macross Frontier O.S.T.1 Nyan FRO.
Macross Frontier O.S.T.2 Nyan TRA☆ 
Macross Frontier Vocal Collection Nyan Tama♀ 
Mizuiro Jidai Musical CD
Napple Tale Original Soundtrack Vol.1: Kaijū Zukan
Napple Tale Original Soundtrack Vol.2: Yōsei Zukan
RahXephon O.S.T. 1
RahXephon Pluralitas Concentio O.S.T.
Record of Lodoss War OST 1
Risky Safety Aa! Soundtrack
The Vision of Escaflowne Original Soundtrack 1
The Vision of Escaflowne Original Soundtrack 3
Tsubasa Chronicle: Future Soundscape I
Tsubasa Chronicle: Future Soundscape III
Tsubasa Chronicle Best Vocal Collection
Wolf's Rain O.S.T
Wolf's Rain O.S.T 2

References

Discographies of Japanese artists
Pop music discographies